Gap station is a railway station serving the town Gap, Hautes-Alpes department, southeastern France. It is situated on the Veynes–Briançon railway. The station is served by night trains to Paris and Briançon, and by regional trains towards Briançon, Grenoble, Valence and Marseille.

References

External links
 

Railway stations in Provence-Alpes-Côte d'Azur